The Principality of Trinidad was a short-lived unrecognized state declared in 1893 when the American James Harden-Hickey claimed the uninhabited Trindade Island in the South Atlantic. He declared himself James I, Prince of Trinidad, and intended for the islands to become a military dictatorship under his leadership.  Britain and Brazil later argued over the territory, and it is now a part of the state of Espírito Santo in southeastern Brazil.

Name
The original name of the island, Trindade, is Portuguese for "trinity"; Trinidad is the Spanish cognate. It is unclear why Harden-Hickley chose to translate the name from Portuguese into Spanish, and not English. Earlier, nearby Ascension Island had been renamed from its original Portuguese name Ascensão when it passed into British hands.

History 
While traveling to Tibet before his marriage, Harden-Hickey noticed the tiny island of Trindade in the South Atlantic Ocean, which had never been claimed by any country and was, legally, terra nullius. In 1893, wanting an independent state where he could serve as its ruler, he claimed the island and proclaimed himself James I, the Prince of Trinidad.

He designed postage stamps, a national flag and coat of arms, and established a chivalric order, the Cross of Trinidad. He bought a schooner to transport colonists, appointed M. Le Comte De la Boissiere as Secretary of State, and opened a consular office at 217 West 36th Street in New York City. He issued government bonds to finance the construction of infrastructure on the island.

In July 1895, the British tried to take possession of the island, basing their claim on the 1700 visit by English astronomer Edmund Halley. The British planned to use the island as a telegraph cable station. However, Brazilian diplomatic efforts pressed a successful claim to Brazilian sovereignty, based on the island's discovery in 1502 by Portuguese navigators.

To demonstrate sovereignty over the island, the state of Espírito Santo, which took the island, built a landmark on 24 January 1897.

Today
Today, Brazil marks its presence with a permanent Brazilian Navy base on the main island.

References

Former unrecognized countries
Former principalities
Former monarchies of South America
Micronations
States and territories established in 1893
1893 establishments in South America
1895 disestablishments
Modern history of Brazil
Espírito Santo